Sir Joseph Prestwich, FRS (12 March 1812 – 23 June 1896) was a British geologist and businessman, known as an expert on the Tertiary Period and for having confirmed the findings of Boucher de Perthes of ancient flint tools in the Somme valley gravel beds.

Biography 
Born in Clapham, Prestwich was educated in Paris and Reading before entering University College, London where he studied chemistry and natural philosophy.  Whilst a student he founded the short-lived Zetetical Society.  In 1830 he began working for the family wine business.  This job required him to travel throughout the United Kingdom and also abroad to France and Belgium, and during the course of these travels he made many geological observations.  He became a Fellow of Geological Society in 1833 and published his first paper there two years later.  His 1836 memoir on the Geology of Coalbrookdale, based upon observations made during 1831 and 1832, established his reputation as a geologist.

From 1846 his attention focused upon the Tertiary deposits of the London Basin, which he subsequently classified and then correlated with Tertiary deposits throughout England, France and Belgium.  In 1858 Prestwich was persuaded by Hugh Falconer to visit Abbeville, where Boucher de Perthes had claimed to have found flint tools in the gravel deposits of the valley of the Somme, thus establishing the antiquity of man. In company with John Evans, Prestwich visited the gravel beds of St Acheul and confirmed the observations of Boucher de Perthes.  Prestwich's report on the matter was published in the Proceedings of the Royal Society for 1859-1860: It is claimed by some authorities that this publication marks the birth of modern scientific archaeology.

During the late 1860s Prestwich served on the Royal Coal Commission and the Royal Commission on the Metropolitan Water Supply.  In 1870–1872 he was president of the Geological Society.  In 1874 he was appointed to the chair of geology at the University of Oxford.  Here he produced in two volumes Geology, Chemical and Physical, Stratigraphical and Palaeontological.  In 1888 he retired from Oxford to Shoreham in Kent where he continued to work until his death in 1896. Prestwich was elected a Fellow of the Royal Society in 1853, awarded its Royal Medal in 1865, awarded a Telford Medal for a paper entitled “On the Geological Conditions affecting the Construction of a Tunnel between England and France,” in 1873.  He was elected as a member of the American Philosophical Society in 1869. Knighted in 1896. He married Grace Anne McCall, the niece of Dr. Hugh Falconer, in 1870.

Notes

References
 "Obituary Notices of Fellows Deceased", Proceedings of the Royal Society of London, Volume 60. (1896—1897), pp. i—xxxv.

External links

1812 births
1896 deaths
People from Clapham
People from Shoreham, Kent
English geologists
Alumni of University College London
Fellows of the Royal Society
Fellows of the Geological Society of London
Wollaston Medal winners
Academics of the University of Oxford
Knights Bachelor
Royal Medal winners